Take back control is a British political slogan associated with the Brexit referendum, popularised by Vote Leave. It was used by supporters of Brexit, Britain's withdrawal from the European Union. The slogan implied that Britain's sovereignty and ability to make its own laws had been lost by its membership of the EU and would return after withdrawal. The slogan was associated with anti-immigration sentiment.

See also 
 Glossary of Brexit terms
 Primacy of European Union law
 Sovereigntism

References 

2016 neologisms
British political phrases
Conservatism in the United Kingdom
2016 United Kingdom European Union membership referendum